David Tattersall,  (born 14 November 1960) is a British cinematographer. He has worked on many big-budget films and was nominated for an Emmy Award for his cinematography on The Young Indiana Jones Chronicles television series. Three of his most noted collaborations include having worked with film directors George Lucas, Frank Darabont and Martin Campbell.

Tattersall studied at Barrow-in-Furness Grammar School for Boys before moving on to Goldsmiths College in London, receiving a first class BA in Fine Arts. He went on to study at Britain's National Film and Television School at Beaconsfield in Buckinghamshire.

The first film Tattersall worked on was Salette in 1986.

Filmography
Film

Television

See also 
 Star Wars
 Cinematography

References

External links
 
 The Starwars.com profile

1960 births
Living people
British cinematographers
Emmy Award winners
Alumni of Goldsmiths, University of London
Alumni of the National Film and Television School